Mind & Matter is a remix album by Collide, released on May 22, 2018 by Noiseplus Music.

Track listing

Personnel
Adapted from the Mind & Matter liner notes.

Collide
 Eric Anest (as Statik) – keyboards
 Karin Johnston (as kaRIN) – vocals

Additional performers
  Richard Barron – string arrangements (1.6)
 Gidon Carmel – live drums (2.14)
 Klaas von Karlos – additional synthesizer (2.14)
 Jordi Kuragari – guitar (2.14)
 Scott Landes – guitar (1.5, 1.6)
 Héloïse Lefebvre – violin (2.14)
 Nicolo Sommer – electronics, mandolin, synthesizer and piano (2.14)

Release history

References

External links 
 Mind & Matter at collide.net
 
 Mind & Matter at Bandcamp
 Mind & Matter at iTunes

Collide (band) albums
2018 remix albums